Chris (or Christopher) Garret(t) may refer to:

* Christopher Garrett (born 1943), British oceanographer
 Christopher L. Garrett (born 1973), Associate Justice of the Oregon Supreme Court
 Chris Garrett (Canadian football) (born 1987), American-born Canadian football running back
 Chris Garrett (linebacker), American football linebacker